The Tick is a side-scrolling beat 'em up video game developed by Software Creations and released by Fox Interactive in 1994. The game was released on the Super NES and Sega Genesis systems and was based on the comic book and Fox Kids animated series of the same name. PlayStation and Sega Saturn versions were planned, but were cancelled for unknown reasons.

Gameplay
The game is very typical for the side-scrolling genre. However, it turns into a semi-isometric view like in Streets of Rage once enemies appear on the screen. The Tick's signature humor is also present in various parts of the game, such as his unorthodox gestures and "Spoon!" battle cry after completing a level (and starting a level in the Genesis version). 44 levels make up the game with "wobble" environments and arcade style graphics.

Reception
Electronic Gaming Monthly gave the Genesis version a 4.75 out of 10, panning the game for its failure to capture the humor of the titular character, the Tick's limited number of moves, the monotonous repetition of the same enemies, the irritating sound effects, and the general boring tone. They scored the Super NES version a 4.8 out of 10, again citing its "tedious action and plain enemies." GamePro also gave the Super NES version a generally negative review. They felt the game succeeded in replicating the humor of the comic book, but that the low frame rate and the "endless wave of the same enemies" made the entire experience unenjoyable.

Brett Allan Weiss of Allgame evaluated the Genesis version as being "repetitive" and "boring".

References

External links
 The Tick (Super NES)
 The Tick at Answers.com
 

1994 video games
North America-exclusive video games
Software Creations games
Fox Interactive games
Platform games
Sega Genesis games
Super Nintendo Entertainment System games
Superhero video games
Video games based on comics
Video games based on television series
Video games based on adaptations
Video Game
Side-scrolling beat 'em ups
Video games developed in the United Kingdom